The Kaunas State Musical Theatre is a musical theatre in Kaunas, Lithuania. It was established on November 27, 1940, in the former State Theatre hall adjoining the Laisvės Alėja. For some time, it mostly presented operettas.

The building
The decision to build a Kaunas City Theatre was made in 1891, and the first play was staged there on January 9, 1892. Renaissance Revival architecture was chosen as a style for the building, and it was built in the City Garden square. The two-storey building incorporated a hall of 500 square meters in size. Spectators also could watch plays from the two-storey balcony rows. In the balconies, special loges were established for the Governor of Kaunas and the commandant of Kaunas Fortress.

After Lithuania established independence in 1918 and Kaunas became the temporary capital, the theatre became a cradle for modern Lithuanian drama, opera and ballet theatres.

The theatre was reconstructed in 1922–1925, 1930-1933 and 1980. The exterior of the building took on characteristics of Baroque Revival architecture, and the audience hall was enlarged to 763 seats, with a third row of balconies and a central loge added.

Romas Kalanta set himself on fire in 1972 as a protest against the Soviet regime in the nearby square.

Musical theater
In 1948, the company of the Lithuanian Opera and Ballet Theatre, which resided in the State Musical Theatre, was moved to Vilnius, and musical theatre became the only dramatic genre cultivated in the building. It built its reputation on staging musical comedies.  After Lithuania  regained independence, the theatre added opera to its repertoire.

Notable performances
Giuseppe Verdi's opera Rigoletto, 1951.

References

General:

 

Theatres in Kaunas
1940 establishments in Lithuania
Performing groups established in 1940